Wola Tesserowa  is a village in the administrative district of Gmina Małogoszcz, within Jędrzejów County, Świętokrzyskie Voivodeship, in south-central Poland.

The village has a population of 370.

References

Wola Tesserowa